The American Conservative (TAC) is a magazine published by the American Ideas Institute which was founded in 2002. Originally published twice a month, it was reduced to monthly publication in August 2009, and since February 2013, it has been bi-monthly.

The publication states that it exists to promote a conservatism that opposes unchecked power in government and business alike; promote the flourishing of families and communities through vibrant markets and free people; and embrace realism and restraint in foreign affairs based on America's national interests, otherwise known as paleoconservatism.

History 
The American Conservative was founded by Pat Buchanan, Scott McConnell and Taki Theodoracopulos in 2002 in opposition to the Iraq War.

McConnell served as the magazine's first editor, followed by executive editor Kara Hopkins.

Before the 2006 midterm elections, The American Conservative urged its readers to vote for Democrats: "It should surprise few readers that we think a vote that is seen—in America and the world at large—as a decisive “No” vote on the Bush presidency is the best outcome".

As of 2007, Buchanan and Taki ceased to be involved with the editorial operations of The American Conservative, although Buchanan continues to contribute columns. Ron Unz was named publisher in 2007. In 2011, Wick Allison became the magazine's publisher, followed in 2013 by Jon Basil Utley, the current publisher.

In 2010, Daniel McCarthy succeeded Hopkins as editor. In September 2011, the magazine introduced an editorial redesign of its print publication and in May 2012 a redesign of its website. In October 2014, Benjamin Schwarz, the former national and literary editor of The Atlantic, was named national editor of the magazine.

In November 2016, Robert W. Merry succeeded McCarthy as editor, with Lewis McCrary and Kelley Beaucar Vlahos as Executive Editors. After Merry's retirement in July 2018, W. James Antle III was named editor.

In April 2020, Johnny Burtka, executive director and acting editor of The American Conservative, said that the publication’s ambition is to "become The Atlantic of the right" and said its online page views had "grown significantly" under the Trump administration.

Reception 
In 2009, Reihan Salam, National Review editor, wrote that the publication had "gained a devoted following as a sharp critic of the conservative mainstream".

In 2012, David Brooks, columnist at The New York Times, called The American Conservative "one of the more dynamic spots on the political Web" and said its "writers like Rod Dreher and Daniel Larison tend to be suspicious of bigness: big corporations, big government, a big military, concentrated power and concentrated wealth."

See also 

 Classical liberalism
 Communitarianism
 Conservatism in the United States
 Libertarianism
 List of United States magazines
 Natural Law
 Neoconservatism
 Realism (international relations)
 Religion in the United States
 Tory
 Traditionalist conservatism

References

External links 
 
 "Buchanan's Takeoff" by Murray Polner, Columbia Journalism Review, January/February 2003.
 "Paleocon's Revenge" by Whitney Joiner. Folio: The Magazine for Magazine Management, September 1, 2002.
 The American Conservative Crackup: Why I quit Pat Buchanan’s magazine by Alexander Konetzki, The Washington Monthly
 The American Conservative by J. Bradford DeLong, May 15, 2012.

2002 establishments in Washington, D.C.
Bimonthly magazines published in the United States
Conservative magazines published in the United States
Libertarian magazines published in the United States
Old Right (United States)
Magazines established in 2002
Magazines published in Washington, D.C.
Paleoconservative publications
Pat Buchanan
Monthly magazines published in the United States